Susan Rubio (born December 25, 1970) is an American politician serving in the California State Senate. A Democrat, she represents the 22nd Senate District in eastern Los Angeles County. Prior to being elected to the California Legislature in 2018, she was an elected official for the City of Baldwin Park for 13 years and a public school teacher for 17 years.

She is the first Latina Chair of the State Senate Insurance Committee, Chair of the Senate Select Committee on Domestic Violence, and Senate Assistant Majority Whip.

Early life and education
Rubio was born in Juarez, Mexico. Rubio's parents twice immigrated to the United States without proper documentation.  The first time the family settled in Texas, from which they were deported in 1975, after about two years. The family returned to the US several years later, again as undocumented immigrants, this time settling in Los Angeles. She became a U.S. citizen in 1994 after being sponsored by her youngest sister, Sylvia, who was born in El Paso.

Rubio attended East Los Angeles College (ELAC) and earned an undergraduate degree and a master's degree in Education from Azusa Pacific University.

Earlier career
Rubio started her teaching career in Baldwin Park Unified School District and was a teacher at Monrovia Unified School District for 17 years. Rubio was first elected as City Clerk in Baldwin Park in 2005. In 2009, she was elected to the Baldwin Park City Council and reelected in 2013.

California State Senate
Rubio represents the 22nd Senate district in eastern Los Angeles County. In 2018, she finished in second place over Baldwin Park City Councilwoman Monica Garcia in the primary, then won November runoff against former state Assemblyman Mike Eng.

Her district comprises the cities of Alhambra, Arcadia, Azusa, Baldwin Park, Covina, El Monte, Industry, Irwindale, La Puente, Monterey Park, San Gabriel, Rosemead, South El Monte, Temple City and West Covina as well as the unincorporated communities of Avocado Heights, Charter Oak, Citrus, East Pasadena, East San Gabriel, Mayflower Village, North El Monte, South Monrovia Island, South San Gabriel, South San Jose Hills, Valinda, Vincent and West Puente Valley.

She is Chair of the Senate Insurance Committee and committee member of Energy, Utilities, Communications; Health; Transportation; and Governmental Organization.  She is a member of the Senate Housing Group and was recently appointed as Senate Assistant Majority Whip.

She is Chair of the Senate Select Committee on Domestic Violence and Co-Chair of the Wildfire Working group. She is also a Select Committee member of The Social Determinants of Children’s Well-Being; Asian Pacific Islander Affairs; Mental Health; California-Mexico Cooperation; and California, Armenia and Artsakh Mutual Trade, Art and Cultural Exchange.

Rubio is a Member of the Latino Legislative Caucus, Legislative Jewish Caucus, Los Angeles Caucus, San Gabriel Valley Caucus and Legislative Women’s Caucus.

Domestic violence legislation
In February 2019, Rubio introduced SB 273, The Phoenix Act, a bill intended to help victims of domestic violence by lengthening the state of limitations from 3 to 5 years in certain cases and requiring additional police training on dealing with such cases. It was signed into law. She also passed SB 316, which requires the number of the National Domestic Violence Hotline to be printed on the back of student ID cards.

In 2020, she passed SB 1141, which allows domestic violence victims to use evidence of psychologically damaging or abusive behavior, commonly referred to as coercive control, as evidence in Family Court or criminal proceedings.

2018 election results

Personal life
Her ex-husband is former Assemblyman Roger Hernández, whom she divorced in 2016 after winning a restraining order due to allegations of several domestic violence incidents during their marriage, including "pushing, shoving, and choking" her. Her sister is California State Assemblywoman Blanca Rubio.

Rubio resides in Baldwin Park, California.

References

External links
 
 Campaign website
 Join California Susan Rubio
 

American politicians of Mexican descent
Democratic Party California state senators
1970 births
Hispanic and Latino American women in politics
Living people
21st-century American politicians
Undocumented immigrants to the United States
21st-century American women politicians
Azusa Pacific University alumni